Globo Filmes is a Brazilian motion picture production company owned by Grupo Globo.

History 
It was founded in 1998 by Roberto Marinho. The films produced or co-produced by the company frequently obtain more than 90% of box office revenue in the Brazilian movie industry and more than 20% of the total market. Globo Filmes is also responsible for distributing its own films. As of October 2017, it has produced 222 movies, and 17 are in production. In all, the films produced have reached around 70 million viewers in movie theaters and formed partnerships with more than 40 independent producers.

Filmography 
1998
 Simão, o Fantasma Trapalhão

1999
 Orfeu
 Zoando na TV
 O Trapalhão e a Luz Azul

2000
 O Auto da Compadecida
 Bossa Nova

2001
 Xuxa e os Duendes
 Caramuru - A Invenção do Brasil
 A Partilha

2002
 City of God
 Xuxa e os Duendes 2: No Caminho das Fadas

2003
 Deus é Brasileiro
 Carandiru
 O Homem Que Copiava
 Didi – O Cupido Trapalhão
 Lisbela e o Prisioneiro
 The Middle of the World
 Maria, Mãe do Filho de Deus
 Os Normais
 Casseta & Planeta – A Taça do Mundo é Nossa
 Acquária
 Xuxa Abracadabra

2004
 Sexo, Amor e Traição
 Meu Tio Matou Um Cara
 Xuxa e o Tesouro da Cidade Perdida
 A Dona da História
 Redentor
 Olga
 Querido Estranho
 Cazuza - O Tempo Não Pára
 Viva Voz

2005
 Tainá 2 - A Aventura Continua
 O Casamento de Romeu e Julieta
 Casa de Areia
 2 Filhos de Francisco
 O Coronel e o Lobisomem
 Vinícius
 Xuxinha e Guto Contra os Monstros do Espaço

2006
 Didi – O Caçador de Tesouros
 Se Eu Fosse Você
 A Máquina
 Irma Vap - O Retorno
 Zuzu Angel
 Anjos do Sol
 Casseta & Planeta - Seus Problemas Acabaram!
 The Greatest Love of All
 Muito Gelo e Dois Dedos D’água
 O Ano em que Meus Pais Saíram de Férias
 Xuxa Gêmeas
 O Cavaleiro Didi e a Princesa Lili

2007
 A Grande Família
 Turma da Mônica em Uma Aventura no Tempo
 Chega de Saudade
 Pro Dia Nascer Feliz
 Antônia
 Caixa Dois
 Ó Paí Ó
 Cartola
 Inesquecível
 Não Por Acaso
 Saneamento Básico, O Filme
 Primo Basílio
 Cidade dos Homens
 O Homem Que Desafiou o Diabo
 Sem Controle
 Xuxa em Sonho de Menina
 Os Porralokinhas

2008
 Meu Nome Não é Johnny
 O Signo da Cidade
 Polaróides Urbanas
 Bodas de Papel
 O Guerreiro Didi e a Ninja Lili
 Era Uma Vez...
 Os Desafinados
 Casa da Mãe Joana
 A Guerra dos Rocha
 Last Stop 174
 Orquestra dos Meninos
 Romance

2009
 Simonal - Ninguém Sabe o Duro que Dei
 Divã
 Verônica
 Surf Adventures 2
 Se Eu Fosse Você 2
 A Mulher Invisível
 Tempos de Paz
 Os Normais 2 - A Noite Mais Maluca De Todas
 Besouro
 Salve Geral
 Alô, Alô, Terezinha!
 Lula, O Filho Do Brasil
 É Proibido Fumar
 Xuxa em O Mistério de Feiurinha

2010
 Lula, o Filho do Brasil
 Chico Xavier
 Quincas Berro D'Água
 O Bem Amado
 400 Contra 1 - Uma História do Crime Organizado
 5x Favela - Agora por Nós Mesmos
 Nosso Lar
 Tropa de Elite 2: o Inimigo agora É Outro
 Aparecida - O Milagre
 De Pernas Pro Ar

2011
 Desenrola
 Brasil Animado
 Bróder
 Qualquer Gato Vira-Lata
 Cilada.com
 Assalto ao Banco Central
 Não Se Preocupe, Nada Vai Dar Certo
 Onde Está a Felicidade
 O Homem do Futuro
 Família Vende Tudo
 O Palhaço

2012
 As Aventuras de Agamenon
 Reis e Ratos
 Billi Pig
 Xingu
 Paraísos Artificiais
 E Aí... Comeu?
 Corações Sujos
 O Diário de Tati
 Totalmente Inocentes
 Até que a Sorte nos Separe
 Gonzaga - de Pai pra Filho
 Os Penetras
 De Pernas pro Ar 2

2013
 Tainá - A Origem
 A Busca
 Vai que Dá Certo
 Giovanni Improtta
 Faroeste Caboclo
 Minha Mãe é uma Peça
 O Concurso
 Flores Raras
 A Casa da Mãe Joana 2
 O Tempo e o Vento
 Mato sem Cachorro
 Serra Pelada
 Meu Passado Me Condena
 Crô - O Filme
 Minhocas
 Até que a Sorte nos Separe 2

2014
 Confissões de Adolescente - O Filme
 Muita Calma Nessa Hora 2
 S.O.S. Mulheres ao Mar
 Entre Nós
 Confia em Mim
 Julio Sumiu
 Getúlio
 Os Homens São de Marte... e é pra lá que eu vou
 Setenta
 Tim Lopes - História de Arcanjo
 Vermelho Brasil
 Amazônia
 Na Quebrada
 Tim Maia
 Made in China
 Irmã Dulce
 Boa Sorte
 A Noite da Virada
 Os Caras de Pau em O Misterioso Roubo do Anel

2015
 Loucas Pra Casar
 Meus Dois Amores
 Entre Abelhas
 Sorria, Você Esta Sendo Filmado - O Filme
 Qualquer Gato Vira-Lata 2
 Meu Passado Me Condena 2
 Real Beleza
 Linda de Morrer
 Que Horas Ela Volta?
 Pequeno Dicionário Amoroso 2
 S.O.S. Mulheres ao Mar 2
 Operações Especiais
 Betinho - A Esperança Equilibrista
 A Floresta Que se Move
 Chico: Artista Brasileiro
 Cinco Vezes Chico - O Velho E Sua Gente
 Até Que A Sorte Nos Separe 3: A Falência Final

2016
 Vai que Dá Certo 2
 Reza a Lenda
 Um Suburbano Sortudo
 Amor em Sampa
 Meu Amigo Hindu
 Mundo Cão
 De Onde Eu Te Vejo
 O Escaravelho do Diabo
 Em Nome da Lei
 Meu Nome é Jacque
 Prova de Coragem
 Brasil: DNA África
 Mais Forte que o Mundo
 Menino 23
 A Corrida do Doping
 Miller & Fried: as origens do país do futebol
 Baía dos Pesadelos
 Vidas Partidas
 Um Namorado Para Minha Mulher
 Aquarius
 Marginal
 Um Homem Só
 É Fada
 O Shaolin do Sertão
 Curumim - O Homem Que Queria Voar
 Através da Sombra
 Sob Pressão
 Elis
 O Filho Eterno
 Magal e os Formigas
 Minha Mãe É Uma Peça 2''

2017
 Os Saltimbancos Trapalhões: Rumo a Hollywood Os Penetras 2 – Quem Dá Mais? Redemoinho La Vingança Galeria F A Glória e a Graça Pitanga Belo Monte – Um Mundo Onde Tudo É Possível Um Tio Quase Perfeito As Aventuras do Pequeno Colombo D.P.A. - O Filme O Filme da Minha Vida Malasartes e o Duelo com a Morte Intolerância.doc João, O Maestro Como Nossos Pais Exodus Duas de Mim Chocante Entre Irmãs A Comédia Divina Vazante Para além da curva da estrada Aqualoucos Não Devore Meu Coração Gabeira Altas Expectativas Silêncio no Estúdio Coragem! As muitas vidas do cardeal Paulo Evaristo Arns Santo Amaro Era Skatista Fala Sério, Mãe!2018
 Garimpeiros do Voto Cartas Para Um Ladrão de Livros Encantados Pra Ficar na História A Imagem da Tolerância Os Farofeiros Rio do Medo Surf no Alemão Aos Teus Olhos Quase Memória Pagliacci Teu Mundo Não Cabe nos Meus Olhos Todos Os Paulos Do Mundo Antes que Eu me Esqueça Não Se Aceitam Devoluções As Boas Maneiras Tungstênio Mulheres Alteradas Uma Quase Dupla O Nome da Morte Querido Embaixador Abrindo o Armário Ferrugem Crô em Família O Paciente - O Caso Tancredo Neves 10 Segundos Para Vencer Tudo por um Popstar A Última Abolição Chacrinha: O Velho Guerreiro O Grande Circo Místico Sequestro Relâmpago SLAM - Voz de Levante Henfil Rasga Coração Intimidade entre Estranhos D.P.A. 2 - O Mistério Italiano Minha Vida em Marte2019
 De Pernas pro Ar 3 Fevereiros Minha Fama de Mau Sai de Baixo - O Filme Tá Rindo de Quê? - Humor e Ditadura Albatroz Cine Holliúdy 2: A Chibata Sideral Mussum - Um Filme do Cacildis Marcia Haydée Espero Tua (Re)volta Bacurau Divino Amor Deslembro Morto Não Fala O Juízo Babenco - Alguém Tem que Ouvir o Coração e Dizer: Parou O Amor Dá Trabalho Maria do Caritó Hebe: A Estrela do Brasil Simonal Carcereiros - O Filme Turma da Mônica: Laços Ela Disse, Ele Disse Vai que Cola 2 – O Começo Os Parças 2 Minha Mãe É uma Peça 32020
 A Divisão De Perto Ela Não É Normal Breve Miragem de Sol Barretão Três Verões Não Vamos Pagar Nada Verlust Boca de Ouro2021
 Um Tio Quase Perfeito 2 Atravessa a Vida Dente por Dente Depois a Louca Sou Eu Lucicreide Vai pra Marte Nazinha, Olhai por Nós O Auto da Boa Mentira Libelu - Abaixo a Ditadura Amigas de Sorte Loop Veneza 4 x 100 - Correndo por um Sonho Doutor Gama Dois Mais Dois L.O.C.A. Homem Onça 45 do Segundo Tempo O Silêncio da Chuva Bravos Valentes - Vaqueiros do Brasil Marighella Turma da Mônica: Lições2022
 Eduardo e Mônica Juntos e Enrolados Tô Ryca 2 Medida Provisória D. P. A. 3 - Uma Aventura no Fim do Mundo Perlimps''

References

External links 
 

Film production companies of Brazil
Grupo Globo subsidiaries
Brazilian brands
Mass media companies established in 1998
1998 establishments in Brazil